Vindija may refer to:
 Vindija Cave, a cave located in northern Croatia, known for being the site of one of the best preserved Neanderthal fossils
 Vindija (company), a Croatian food company based in Varaždin